Poland–Vietnam relations refers to the current and historical relations between Poland and Vietnam. Poland has an embassy in Hanoi and Vietnam has an embassy in Warsaw.

The relationship between these two nations can be described as special because they both share historical parallels, although they are very culturally different from one another and they are  geographically very far apart. Both Poland and Vietnam have had a long history of struggles against powerful foreign invaders such as Russia and Germany, and China. These shared historical struggles are mentioned in the Vietnamese poem My dear, Poland by the Vietnamese poet Tố Hữu.

History

While the two nations have little in common due to their geographical positions, they undeniably share historical parallels. Both Poland and Vietnam were given credit for having repelled the invasions from two of the most powerful empires in history; Poland repelled the invasion from the Ottoman Empire and Vietnam repelled the invasion from the Mongol Empire. Also, both nations have  contributed to producing some of the most popular, charismatic and revered national heroes in their respective histories. Poland produced such national heroes as John III Sobieski, Józef Piłsudski, Józef Poniatowski, Witold Pilecki, Tadeusz Kościuszko, Casimir Pulaski, Witold Urbanowicz and Pope John Paul II; whereas Vietnam has Ngô Quyền, Trần Hưng Đạo, Võ Nguyên Giáp, Phan Bội Châu, Trưng Sisters, Nguyễn An and Lý Long Tường. Some of these figures are also revered outside their nations. For example, Urbanowicz is popular in Britain. Pulaski and Kościuszko are revered in the U.S. Lý Long Tường is a well-known figure in Korea and Nguyễn An is well known in China.

Both nations also share some commonalities in how brutally they were treated by the foreign powers. In their long historical struggles for independence, the Poles and the Vietnamese both had to fight many powerful invaders. Usually, Poland and Vietnam had to fight Russia/German states and China respectively, and they both very often had to suffer destruction and devastation.

In the recent history both nations were also occupied by powerful nations. Poland was occupied by Nazi Germany and Soviet Union, whereas Vietnam was occupied by Vichy France and Japanese Empire during the World War II. They were the brutal victims of massacres launched by these imperial forces.

Both nations also resisted very bravely. Poland launched the Warsaw Uprising to resist against German occupation and the Vietnamese started the August Revolution to fight against the colonial rule of the French and the Japanese. As such, Vietnam received much sympathy from Polish co-workers when they arrived in North Vietnam in the 1960s and the Vietnamese immigrants in Poland also perceived Poland in a similar manner because of their historical parallels. When Vietnam were subject to global condemnations and embargoes that were raised by the United States and China, both the Polish government and the Solidarity movement expressed solidarity with Vietnam's fight against the Khmer Rouge in Cambodia. It was an act that led to the deployment of Polish troops in Cambodia under the UN mission to help stabilize the political situation in Cambodia.

In 1946, the future founder of Israel, a Polish Jew, David Ben-Gurion, met Hồ Chí Minh in Paris. His desire of establishing Israel and the historical impression from Ho to Poland was considered as the first unofficial tie between Vietnam and Poland. 

Official diplomatic relations were established in 1950. Janusz Lewandowski, representative of Polish delegation during the Geneva Accords at 1954, had protested the idea of separating Vietnam into two parts that proposed by the Government of newly established People's Republic of China. To monitor the Geneva Accords, the International Control Commission (ICC) consisting of diplomats and soldiers from Poland, India and Canada was set up. The chairman of the ICC was always Indian while the Canadians were expected to support South Vietnam while the Poles were expected to support North Vietnam. In practice, the ICC did not work as expected with the Indian delegation often taking a more pro-North position than the Polish delegation who contrary to expectations proved to be more neutral.  
Poland–Vietnam relations grew from the 1950s and 1980s student exchange programs, during which time both Poland and Vietnam were socialist republics under the grasp of the Soviet Union. Both states were members of Comecon.

During the Vietnam War, Polish diplomats in North Vietnam collaborated with Italian diplomats in South Vietnam in order to seek peace and end the Vietnam War. The first effort was the "Maneli Affair" of 1963 named after the Polish commissioner on the ICC, Mieczysław Maneli. The "Maneli Affair" involved a proposal to end the war and ultimately set up a federation of North Vietnam and South Vietnam. The second effort of 1966 was known as Operation Marigold. In Marigold, Janusz Lewandowski of the ICC met with the American ambassador to South Vietnam, Henry Cabot Lodge Jr., presenting an offer on behalf of North Vietnam to open peace talks provided the American stopped bombing North Vietnam first.

After returning to Vietnam, Vietnamese graduates of Polish universities often were leading specialists in key areas of the country's developing economy, including mining and shipbuilding. In the 1980s, the Vietnamese-Polish Friendship Hospital was built in Vinh, Vietnam with Poland's help. The hospital continues to be supported by Poland as it donates medical equipment and provides professional courses for the hospital's Vietnamese doctors. Thanks to Vietnamese graduates of Polish universities, the works of the most renown Polish writers, such as Henryk Sienkiewicz, Adam Mickiewicz and Bolesław Prus, were translated into Vietnamese.

In 2017, an office of the Polish Investment and Trade Agency was opened in Ho Chi Minh City in the presence of Polish President Andrzej Duda. Vietnam is Poland's largest trading partner among the ASEAN countries (as of 2020). On August 1, 2020, the European Union–Vietnam Free Trade Agreement came into force, which eliminated 99% of tariffs in trade between Vietnam and EU countries, including Poland.

Following the outbreak of the COVID-19 pandemic in Poland, in March 2020, Vietnam aided Poland by sending 4,000 COVID-19 testing kits, as well as medical gowns and gloves for Polish medics. The aid was organized by the Vietnamese community in Poland.

In August 2021, Poland donated over 500,000 COVID-19 vaccines to Vietnam. In September 2021, over 8 tons of medical equipment arrived from Poland to Vietnam, and in October 2021, Poland donated another over 880,000 vaccines. During a meeting with Poland's ambassador to Vietnam Wojciech Gerwel, Vietnamese Foreign Minister Bùi Thanh Sơn expressed gratitude for the donation, also stressing the long-standing traditional friendship between the nations. Vietnam is the first Southeast Asian country to receive such aid from Poland.

Polish Catholic influence in Vietnam

Throughout history of their relations, Poland had played, both unofficial and official role, on the growth and buildup of Roman Catholicism in Vietnam; since Roman Catholicism is the major religion in Poland. In 17th century, Polish Catholic Jesuit, Wojciech Męciński, visited Vietnam in a tour through Asia, and had documented about Vietnam as the first Polish official record of the country.

Pope John Paul II, who was of Polish descent, had canonized all Vietnamese Catholics who died from 1533 to protect Christianity as Vietnamese Martyrs in 1988. The Polish Pope opted an open opportunity to establish relations with Vietnam; and had recognized the importance of Our Lady of La Vang, a Marian apparition in La Vang. He had also expressed desire to rebuild the La Vang Basilica in commemoration of the 200th anniversary of the first vision. His message was instrumental, leading to the Government of Vietnam to acknowledge the importance of La Vang in Christian history of Vietnam. The Polish Pope remained a revered figure among Vietnamese, both Catholics and non-Catholics, even when he died in 2005. The Polish Pope was also seen as having laid the framework to normalization of relations between the Holy See and Vietnam

Archbishop Marek Zalewski, who is the second Vatican non-residential representative to Vietnam, is from Poland. He played a minor role, yet facilitated an unofficial link on the ongoing normalization between Holy See–Vietnam relations, which was seen with the direct result of Vatican's decision to establish a permanent representative in Vietnam and accepted by the Vietnamese regime, moving further to possible future establishment of official tie between two entities and lax of suppression on Catholicism in Vietnam by the Vietnamese regime.

Cultural relations 

The 10th-Anniversary Stadium has been called the center of the Vietnamese-Polish community. The Vietnamese community is also served by a number of non-governmental organizations, run by the community itself.

The Vietnamese-Polish Friendship High School in Hanoi was named in honor of relationship between Vietnam and Poland, and Poland donated equipment to the school several times. Also in Hanoi, the Marie Curie High School was named in honor of the famous Polish woman scientist. There is also a statue of Kazimierz Kwiatkowski, who helped revive the city of Hội An, in the same city.

State visits

From Poland 
President of Poland in 1999
Prime Minister of Poland in 2005
President Andrzej Duda's visit to Vietnam in 2017

From Vietnam 
Prime Minister of Vietnam in 1997 
President of Vietnam in 2003
 Prime Minister in 2007

Contributions and Development Assistance
Kazimierz Kwiatkowski contributed immensely to the restoration of the historic city of Hoi An, the Mỹ Sơn Sanctuary and the Complex of Huế Monuments. His contributions led to all three sites being recognized as World Heritage Sites by UNESCO, also making Hoi An one of the most popular tourist attractions in the world. His statue can be found in the city of Hoi An.

In 2015, Poland offered to loan Vietnam EUR 250 million as a form of official development assistance. The financial co-operation framework agreement was eventually signed between the two countries in 2017. In the same year, Adamed Group made the largest direct Polish investment in Vietnam by acquiring a controlling stake in Davipharm Co.

Migration

There has been significant migration of Vietnamese people to Poland estimated to be between 30,000 and 40,000 forming the largest non European migrant community in Poland.

Following the Polish transition to a capitalist economy in 1990, and the reforms of Vietnam at 1986, Poland became a more attractive immigration destination for the Vietnamese people, in particular, small entrepreneurs; this triggered a second, larger wave of Vietnamese immigrants to Poland.

Books and articles
Karnow, Stanley Vietnam: A History, New York: Viking, 1983, 
Gnoinska, Margaret "Poland and Vietnam, 1963: New Evidence on Secret Communist Diplomacy and the "Maneli Affair"" pages 2-83 from Cold War International History Project Working Paper 45 March 2005
Thakur, Ramesh "Peacekeeping and Foreign Policy: Canada, India and the International Commission in Vietnam, 1954-1965" pages 125-153 from British Journal of International Studies Volume 6, Issue 2, July 1980

See also 
 Foreign relations of Poland
 Foreign relations of Vietnam

References

External links
Embassy of the Republic of Poland in Hanoi, Vietnam 
Embassy of the Socialist Republic of Vietnam in Warsaw, Poland

 
Vietnam
Poland